Manduca trimacula is a moth of the  family Sphingidae. It is found from Colombia to Ecuador, Venezuela and Bolivia.

The length of the forewings is 55–60 mm. The body and forewing uppersides are brownish-yellow, mottled with grey and tawny olive. There is a creamy white streak located above the eye. The abdomen underside is dirty white, with brown mesial spots. The underside of both wings is brownish-yellow, although darker brown distally. The hindwing upperside is blackish brown.

References

Manduca
Moths described in 1903